The Northern Tier is the northernmost part of the contiguous United States, along the border with Canada (including the border on the Great Lakes). It can be defined as the states that border Canada (excluding Alaska), but historians include all of New England in the Northern Tier, as well as states of the Pacific Northwest, because of the common culture they shared for more than a century.  Sometimes the area was called "Greater New England", because of the influence of its culture as migrants moved west across the continent.  It had a consistent political culture until the 1960s.  Moving east to west (as the majority of population did), such states include: Connecticut, Massachusetts, Rhode Island, New Hampshire, Maine, Vermont, New York, Michigan, Wisconsin, Iowa, Minnesota, South Dakota, North Dakota, Montana, Idaho, Oregon and Washington.

See also
Upper Midwest
North Country, New York
Yankee
Northern United States
International border states of the United States

References

Regions of the United States
Canada–United States border